Daniel Williams (20 November 1924 – 3 February 2019) was an English football player and manager.

Playing career
Born in Thrybergh, Williams began his career with Silverwood Colliery and he spent his entire professional playing career with Rotherham United as either a left-half or inside-forward between 1943 and 1965. He made 461 league appearances, scoring 21 goals.

Management career
He managed Rotherham United (1962-1965), Swindon Town (1965-1969) and (1974-1978), Sheffield Wednesday (1969-1971) and Mansfield Town (1971-1974).

He led Swindon to victory in the 1969 Football League Cup Final, the 1969 Anglo-Italian League Cup and the 1970 Anglo-Italian Cup.

After leaving his role as Swindon manager in 1978, he then worked as general manager until 1985.

Death
He died on 3 February 2019, aged 94.

References

1924 births
2019 deaths
English footballers
Association football wing halves
Association football inside forwards
Silverwood Colliery F.C. players
Rotherham United F.C. players
English Football League players
English football managers
Mansfield Town F.C. managers
Rotherham United F.C. managers
Sheffield Wednesday F.C. managers
Swindon Town F.C. managers
English Football League managers
Swindon Town F.C. non-playing staff